Michael Park may refer to:
 Michael Park (co-driver) (1966–2005), British rally co-driver
 Michael Park (actor) (born 1968), American actor
 Michael H. Park (born 1976),  United States Circuit Judge
 Mike Park (active since 1985), Korean American musician and activist

See also
 Michael Park School, a Steiner School in New Zealand
 Michael Parks (disambiguation)